The Keyton V60 is a compact crossover MPV made by Keyton built on the same platform as the Keyton EX80. It was released in late 2015.

Description
The Keyton V60 has 5 doors and 7 seats. Being based on the same platform as the Keyton EX80, the V60 has dimensions of 4505 mm/1730 mm/1788 mm, and a wheelbase of 2721 mm.

Models
The Keyton V60 comes in 3 trim levels: comfort, luxury, and noble. The comfort model costs 56.9 thousand yuan, luxury costs 62.9 thousand yuan, and the noble model costs 66.9 thousand yuan.

Powertrain
The V60 can be configured with either a 1.2 liter or a 1.5 liter engine, and the V60 has a 150 km/h top speed.

Rebadged Models

Keyton X7
The Keyton X7 was a rebadged model of the V60. It had the same configurations, the only difference being larger tires.

Keyton EX7
In 2018, an electric-powered variant was launched called the Keyton EX7. The EX7 is a pure electric battery electric vehicle that runs on a 60 kW motor, while sharing the same body and configurations as the V60. Its main export destination is Brazil and other South American countries

See also
Keyton EX80

References

Cars of China
Crossover sport utility vehicles
Cars introduced in 2015
Compact MPVs
Vans
Rear-wheel-drive vehicles